Alexandra Försterling (born 27 November 1999) is a German professional golfer. She won the 2014 European Young Masters and was runner-up at the 2020 European Ladies' Team Championship and the 2021 European Ladies Amateur.

Amateur career
Försterling became a member of the German National Team in 2014, the year in which she won the European Young Masters both individually and with the team. Also in 2014, she was selected for the European team at the Junior Ryder Cup, held at Blairgowrie Golf Club in Scotland.

She appeared four times at the European Girls' Team Championship between 2014 and 2017. Along with Helen Tamy Kreuzer, Aline Krauter and Paula Schulz-Hanssen she was runner-up at the 2020 European Ladies' Team Championship, beaten 2–1 in the final by a Swedish team with Linn Grant, Ingrid Lindblad, Maja Stark and Beatrice Wallin.

Försterling won the Berlin Open in 2016, 2017 and 2019. In 2017, she finished third at the Helen Holm Scottish Women's Open Championship, 7 strokes behind Linn Grant.

Försterling enrolled at Arizona State University in 2018 and started playing with the Arizona State Sun Devils women's golf team. In 2021, she shared the Match in the Desert individual title with teammate Linn Grant, after firing a 68 in the opening round.

In 2021, she won the German International Amateur, carding rounds of 70, 68, 66 and 68 to finish at 272 and win by four. She was runner-up at the European Ladies Amateur in Italy, 3 strokes behind Ingrid Lindblad.

Professional career
Försterling turned professional in December 2022.

Amateur wins
2014 European Young Masters
2016 Coca-Cola Berlin Open
2017 Berlin Open Championship
2019 Berlin Open Championship
2021 German International Amateur
2022 Ping/ASU Invitational

Source:

Team appearances
Amateur
Junior Ryder Cup (representing Europe): 2014
European Young Masters (representing Germany): 2014 (winners)
World Junior Girls Championship (representing Germany): 2017
European Girls' Team Championship (representing Germany): 2014, 2015, 2016, 2017
European Ladies' Team Championship (representing Germany): 2020, 2021, 2022
Espirito Santo Trophy (representing Germany): 2022
Arnold Palmer Cup  (representing International team): 2022 (winners)

Source:

References

German female golfers
Arizona State Sun Devils women's golfers
Sportspeople from Berlin
1999 births
Living people
21st-century German women